Caseres is a municipality in the comarca of la Terra Alta in Catalonia, Spain.

This town is located in picturesque surroundings, but many wind turbines are being constructed in the Serra dels Pesells hills nearby. The name of the village appears already in 1153 in documents of the Miravet castle, which belonged at that time to the Knights Templar order, and later to the Knights Hospitaller in 1359.

Presently the town derives some income from rural tourism.

References

External links 

 Pàgina web de l'Ajuntament
 Government data pages 

Municipalities in Terra Alta (comarca)